Heather Pringle is a Canadian freelance science writer who mostly writes about archaeology. Before becoming a writer, Pringle worked as a museum researcher and book editor. Her 2006 book The Master Plan detailed Heinrich Himmler's establishment of the Ahnenerbe in a pseudo-scientific attempt to manufacture evidence and "prove" Aryan superiority. It won the Hubert Evans Non-Fiction Prize. Her previous work includes The Mummy Congress, as well as articles for National Geographic and Archaeology magazine. Pringle is emeritus editor at Hakai Magazine and has been awarded a Canadian National Magazine Award and an AAAS Kavli Science Journalism Award from the American Association for the Advancement of Science and the Kavli Foundation.

References

External links

Living people
Canadian women non-fiction writers
21st-century Canadian women writers
Year of birth missing (living people)
Canadian editors